Muhammad Shamsher Ali is a former president of the Bangladesh Academy of Sciences, former vice-chancellor of Southeast University and former founder vice-chancellor of Bangladesh Open University.

Early life and education

Shamsher Ali was born in Bheramara, Kushtia, Bangladesh, to parents from Shingia, Jessore.

Shamsher Ali obtained his Master of Science (MSc) degree in physics from the University of Dhaka in 1960 and PhD in theoretical nuclear physics from Manchester University, UK in 1965.

Career
He was a professor of physics at the University of Dhaka from 1982 to 2006. Prior to teaching, he worked at the International Centre for Theoretical Physics in Trieste, Italy. He also worked the Pakistan and Bangladesh Atomic Energy Commissions in various positions including directorship of the Bangladesh Atomic Energy Commission, Dhaka (1970–78). From 2004 to 2012, he served as the president of the Bangladesh Academy of Sciences. He then served as the vice-chancellor of Southeast University, Dhaka, Bangladesh.

Academic memberships
 Fellow of the Bangladesh Physical Society
 Fellow of the Bangladesh Academy of Sciences
 Member, Board of Governors, National Council of Science and Technology, Bangladesh, (1978–1981) 
 Senior & Honorary Associate, the Abdus Salam International Center for Theoretical Physics, Trieste, Italy.
 Fellow, Islamic World Academy of Sciences (IAS), Jordan.
 Fellow, Bangladesh Academy of Sciences.
 Fellow, Bangla Academy

Books

Author 
 Aladdin's Real Lamp (Sucheepatra, 2013. . 248 pages)

Editor 
 Scientific Indications in the Holy Qur'an (Islamic Foundation Bangladesh)
 Muslim Contribution to Science and Technology (Islamic Foundation Bangladesh)

Contributor 
 Oliver Leaman, The Qur'an: an Encyclopedia (Routledge, 2005. . 800 Pages)

References

External links
 Page at Southeast University (Bangladesh) 

Bangladeshi academic administrators
Bangladeshi scientists
Living people
Year of birth missing (living people)
Fellows of Bangladesh Academy of Sciences
University of Dhaka alumni
Honorary Fellows of Bangla Academy
Fellows of the Bangladesh Physical Society
Academic staff of Bangladesh Open University